Matthew Jay Cushing (born July 2, 1975) is a former professional American football player who played tight end for six seasons for the Pittsburgh Steelers.

Cushing was a 1998 undrafted free agent of the Steelers who was released during camp that year. After injuries to Mark Bruener and Mitch Lyons in 1999, he obtained a roster spot. Cushing went on to increase his value to the team by serving as an emergency fullback.

In college, at Illinois, he was a three-year starter who received the Bruce Capel award as most courageous player and was an Academic All Big Ten selection.

In February 2010, Cushing was sworn in as a Downers Grove, IL park district commissioner. He is currently President of a Downers Grove, Illinois company, First Choice Dental Lab.

External links
Pittsburgh Steelers bio
Just Sports Stats

1975 births
Living people
Players of American football from South Bend, Indiana
American football tight ends
Illinois Fighting Illini football players
Pittsburgh Steelers players
Amsterdam Admirals players